Santo-Pietro-di-Tenda (French form) or Santo Pietro di Tenda (Italian form; , also ) is a French commune in the Haute-Corse department on the island of Corsica.

Population

See also
Communes of the Haute-Corse department

References

External links
 Santo-Pietro-di-Tenda Pictures 

Communes of Haute-Corse